(William Henry) Irwin McLean (born 1963) FRS FRSE FMedSci is Emeritus Professor of Genetic Medicine,  at the School of Life Sciences, University of Dundee.

Education
McLean was educated at Queen's University of Belfast where he was awarded a Bachelor of Science degree with honours in microbiology in 1985 followed by a PhD in 1988 for electrophoretic and immunological analysis of proteins involved in muscular dystrophy.

Research
The McLean Lab investigates genetic disorders that affect the cells and tissues of the epithelium and is funded by the Medical Research Council (MRC) and the Wellcome Trust.

Awards and honours
McLean was elected a fellow of the Royal Society in 2014. His nomination reads:

References

Living people
Fellows of the Royal Society
Fellows of the Academy of Medical Sciences (United Kingdom)
Fellows of the Royal Society of Edinburgh
1963 births
Geneticists from Northern Ireland
Irish geneticists
Fellows of the Royal Society of Biology
British geneticists
British scientists
British biologists